Andrew Lloyd Webber, Baron Lloyd-Webber  (born 22 March 1948), is an English composer and impresario of musical theatre. Several of his musicals have run for more than a decade both in the West End and on Broadway. He has composed 21 musicals, a song cycle, a set of variations, two film scores, and a Latin Requiem Mass.

Several of his songs have been widely recorded and were successful outside of their parent musicals, such as "Memory" from Cats, "The Music of the Night" and "All I Ask of You" from The Phantom of the Opera, "I Don't Know How to Love Him" from Jesus Christ Superstar, "Don't Cry for Me Argentina" from Evita, and "Any Dream Will Do" from Joseph and the Amazing Technicolor Dreamcoat. In 2001, The New York Times referred to him as "the most commercially successful composer in history". The Daily Telegraph ranked him the "fifth most powerful person in British culture" in 2008, lyricist Don Black writing "Andrew more or less single-handedly reinvented the musical."

He has received a number of awards, including a knighthood in 1992, followed by a peerage for services to the arts, six Tonys, three Grammys (as well as the Grammy Legend Award), an Academy Award, 14 Ivor Novello Awards, seven Olivier Awards, a Golden Globe, a Brit Award, the 2006 Kennedy Center Honors, the 2008 Classic Brit Award for Outstanding Contribution to Music, and an Emmy Award. He is one of 18 people to have won an Oscar, an Emmy, a Grammy, and a Tony. He has a star on the Hollywood Walk of Fame, is an inductee into the Songwriter's Hall of Fame, and is a fellow of the British Academy of Songwriters, Composers, and Authors.

His company, the Really Useful Group, is one of the largest theatre operators in London. Producers in several parts of the UK have staged productions, including national tours, of the Lloyd Webber musicals under licence from the Really Useful Group. Lloyd Webber is also the president of the Arts Educational Schools, London, a performing arts school located in Chiswick, West London. He is involved in a number of charitable activities, including the Elton John AIDS Foundation, Nordoff Robbins, Prostate Cancer UK and War Child. In 1992, he started the Andrew Lloyd Webber Foundation which supports the arts, culture, and heritage of the UK. In 2014 he designed a Cats-themed Paddington Bear statue, which was auctioned to raise funds for the National Society for the Prevention of Cruelty to Children (NSPCC).

Early life

Andrew Lloyd Webber was born on 22 March 1948 in Kensington, London, the elder son of William Lloyd Webber (1914–1982), a composer and organist, and Jean Hermione Johnstone (1921–1993), a violinist and pianist. His younger brother, Julian Lloyd Webber, is a world-renowned solo cellist.

Lloyd Webber started writing his own music at a young age: a suite of six pieces at the age of nine. He also put on "productions" with Julian and his Aunt Viola in his toy theatre (which he built at Viola's suggestion). His aunt Viola, an actress, took him to see many of her shows and through the stage door into the world of the theatre. His father enrolled him as a part-time student at the Eric Gilder School of Music in the spring of 1963. At this time he was working on a Genghis Khan musical called Westonia!, and he had also set music to Old Possum's Book of Practical Cats.

In 1965, Lloyd Webber was a Queen's Scholar at Westminster School and studied history for a term at Magdalen College, Oxford, although he abandoned the course in the winter of 1965 to study at the Royal College of Music in London and pursue his interest in musical theatre.

Professional career

Early years
In 1965, when Lloyd Webber was a 17-year-old budding musical-theatre composer, he was introduced to the 20-year-old aspiring pop-song writer Tim Rice. Their first collaboration was The Likes of Us, a musical based on the true story of Thomas John Barnardo. They produced a demo tape of that work in 1966, but the project failed to gain a backer.

Although composed in 1965, The Likes of Us was not publicly performed until 2005, when a production was staged at Lloyd Webber's Sydmonton Festival. In 2008, amateur rights were released by the National Operatic and Dramatic Association (NODA) in association with the Really Useful Group. The first amateur performance was by a children's theatre group in Cornwall called "Kidz R Us". Stylistically, The Likes of Us is fashioned after the Broadway musical of the 1940s and 1950s; it opens with a traditional overture comprising a medley of tunes from the show, and the score reflects some of Lloyd Webber's early influences, particularly Richard Rodgers, Frederick Loewe, and Lionel Bart. In this respect, it is markedly different from the composer's later work, which tends to be either predominantly or wholly through-composed, and closer in form to opera.

In the summer of 1967, Alan Doggett, a family friend of the Lloyd Webbers who had assisted on The Likes of Us and who was the music teacher at the Colet Court school in London, commissioned Lloyd Webber and Rice to write a piece for the school's choir. Doggett requested a "pop cantata" along the lines of Herbert Chappell's The Daniel Jazz (1963) and Michael Hurd's Jonah-Man Jazz (1966), both of which had been published by Novello and were based on the Old Testament. The request for the new piece came with a 100-guinea advance from Novello. This resulted in Joseph and the Amazing Technicolor Dreamcoat, a retelling of the biblical story of Joseph, in which Lloyd Webber and Rice humorously pastiched a number of pop-music styles such as Elvis-style rock'n'roll, Calypso and country music. Joseph began life as a short cantata that gained some recognition on its second staging with a favourable review in The Times. For its subsequent performances, Rice and Lloyd Webber revised the show and added new songs to expand it to a more substantial length. Continued expansion eventually culminated in a 1972 stage musical and then a two-hour-long production being staged in the West End in 1973 on the back of the success of Jesus Christ Superstar.

In 1969, Rice and Lloyd Webber wrote a song for the Eurovision Song Contest called "Try It and See", which was not selected. With rewritten lyrics, it became "King Herod's Song" in their third musical, Jesus Christ Superstar (1970). Debuting on Broadway in 1971, by 1980 the musical had grossed more than  worldwide. Running for over eight years in London between 1972 and 1980, it held the record for longest-running West End musical before it was overtaken by Cats in 1989. The planned follow-up to Jesus Christ Superstar was a musical comedy based on the Jeeves and Wooster novels by P. G. Wodehouse. Tim Rice was uncertain about this venture, partly because of his concern that he might not be able to do justice to the novels that he and Lloyd Webber so admired. Rice backed out of the project and Lloyd Webber subsequently wrote the musical Jeeves with Alan Ayckbourn, who provided the book and lyrics. Jeeves failed to make any impact at the box office and closed after a run of only 38 performances in the West End in 1975. Many years later, Lloyd Webber and Ayckbourn revisited this project, producing a thoroughly reworked and more successful version entitled By Jeeves (1996).

Mid-1970s

Lloyd Webber collaborated with Rice once again to write Evita (1978), a musical based on the life of Eva Perón. As with Jesus Christ Superstar, Evita was released first as a concept album (1976), featuring Julie Covington singing the part of Eva Perón. The song "Don't Cry for Me Argentina" became a hit single and the musical was staged at the West End's Prince Edward Theatre in a production directed by Harold Prince and starring Elaine Paige in the title role. This original production was enormously successful, eventually running for nearly eight years in the West End.

Evita transferred to Broadway in 1979, in a production starring Patti LuPone as Eva and Mandy Patinkin as Che; it won seven Tony Awards, including Best Musical, helped launch the careers of both LuPone and Patinkin, and ran for almost four years. Rice and Lloyd Webber parted ways soon after Evita, although they have sporadically worked together in the years that followed.

In 1978, Lloyd Webber embarked on a solo project, the Variations, with his cellist brother Julian based on the 24th Caprice by Paganini, which reached number two in the pop album chart in the United Kingdom. The main theme was used as the theme tune for ITV's long-running South Bank Show throughout its 32-year run. The same year, Lloyd Webber also composed a new theme tune for the long-running documentary series Whicker's World, which was used from 1978 to 1980.

1980s
Lloyd Webber was the subject of This Is Your Life in November 1980 when he was surprised by Eamonn Andrews in the foyer of Thames Television's Euston Road Studios in London. He would be honoured a second time by the television programme in November 1994 when Michael Aspel surprised him at the West End's Adelphi Theatre.

Lloyd Webber embarked on his next project without a lyricist, turning instead to the poetry of T. S. Eliot. Cats (1981) was to become the longest running musical in London, where it ran for 21 years before closing. On Broadway, Cats ran for 18 years, a record which would ultimately be broken by another Lloyd Webber musical, The Phantom of the Opera. Elaine Paige collaborated again with Lloyd Webber, originating the role of Grizabella in Cats, and had a Top 10 UK hit with "Memory".

Starlight Express (1984) was a commercial hit, but received negative reviews from the critics. It ran for 7,409 performances in London, making it the ninth longest-running West End show. It ran for less than two years on Broadway. The show has also seen two tours of the US, as well as an Australian/Japanese production, a three-year UK touring production, which transferred to New Zealand later in 2009. The show also runs full-time in a custom-built theatre in Bochum, Germany, where it has been running since 1988.

Lloyd Webber wrote a Requiem Mass dedicated to his father, William, who had died in 1982. It premiered at St. Thomas Church in New York on 24 February 1985. Church music had been a part of the composer's upbringing and the composition was inspired by an article he had read about the plight of Cambodian orphans. Lloyd Webber had on a number of occasions written sacred music for the annual Sydmonton Festival. Lloyd Webber received a Grammy Award in 1986 for Requiem in the category of best classical composition. Pie Jesu from Requiem achieved a high placing on the UK singles chart. Perhaps because of its large orchestration, live performances of the Requiem are rare.

In 1986, Prince Edward, the youngest son of Queen Elizabeth II, commissioned a short musical from Lloyd Webber and Rice for his mother's 60th birthday celebration. Cricket (1986), also called Cricket (Hearts and Wickets), reunited Lloyd Webber with Rice to create this short musical for the Queen's birthday, first performed at Windsor Castle. Several of the tunes were later used for Aspects of Love and Sunset Boulevard.

Lloyd Webber premiered The Phantom of the Opera at Her Majesty's Theatre in the West End in 1986, inspired by the 1911 Gaston Leroux novel. He wrote the part of Christine for his then-wife, Sarah Brightman, who played the role in the original London and Broadway productions alongside Michael Crawford as the Phantom. The production was directed by Harold Prince, who had also earlier directed Evita. Charles Hart wrote the lyrics for Phantom with some additional material provided by Richard Stilgoe, with whom Lloyd Webber co-wrote the book of the musical. It became a hit and is still running in both the West End and on Broadway; in January 2006 it overtook Lloyd Webber's Cats as the longest running show on Broadway. On 11 February 2012, Phantom of the Opera played its 10,000th show on Broadway. With over 13,400 London productions it is the second longest-running West End musical.

Aspects of Love followed in 1989, a musical based on the story by David Garnett. The lyrics were by Don Black and Charles Hart and the original production was directed by Trevor Nunn. Aspects had a run of four years in London, but closed after less than a year on Broadway. It has since gone on a tour of the UK. It is famous for the song "Love Changes Everything", which was performed by Michael Ball in both the West End and Broadway casts. It stayed in the UK singles chart for 14 weeks, peaking at number 2 and becoming Ball's signature tune.

1990s
Lloyd Webber was asked to write a song for the 1992 Barcelona Olympics and composed "Amigos Para Siempre — Friends for Life" with Don Black providing the lyrics. This song was performed by Sarah Brightman and José Carreras.

Lloyd Webber had toyed with the idea of writing a musical based on Billy Wilder's critically acclaimed movie, Sunset Boulevard, since the early 1970s when he saw the film, but the project didn't come to fruition until after the completion of Aspects of Love when the composer finally managed to secure the rights from Paramount Pictures, The composer worked with two collaborators, as he had done on Aspects of Love; this time Christopher Hampton and Don Black shared equal credit for the book and lyrics. Sunset Boulevard opened at the Adelphi Theatre in London on 12 July 1993, and ran for 1,529 performances. In spite of the show's popularity and extensive run in London's West End, it lost money due to the sheer expense of the production.

In 1994, Sunset Boulevard became a successful Broadway show, opening with the largest advance in Broadway history, and winning seven Tony Awards that year. Even so, by its closing in 1997, "it had not recouped its reported $13 million investment." From 1995 to 2000, Lloyd Webber wrote the Matters of Taste column in The Daily Telegraph where he reviewed restaurants and hotels, and these were illustrated by Lucinda Rogers.

In 1998, Lloyd Webber released a film version of Cats, which was filmed at the Adelphi Theatre in London. David Mallet directed the film, and Gillian Lynne choreographed it. The cast consisted of performers who had been in the show before, including Ken Page (the original Old Deuteronomy on Broadway), Elaine Paige (original Grizabella in London) and John Mills as Gus: the Theatre Cat.

In 1998, Whistle Down the Wind made its debut, a musical written with lyrics supplied by Jim Steinman. Originally opening in Washington, Lloyd Webber was reportedly not happy with the casting or Harold Prince's production and the show was subsequently revised for a London staging directed by Gale Edwards. The production included the Boyzone number-one hit "No Matter What", which remained at the top of the UK charts for three weeks. His The Beautiful Game opened in London and has never been seen on Broadway. The show had a respectable run at The Cambridge Theatre in London. The show has been re-worked into a new musical, The Boys in the Photograph, which had its world première at The Liverpool Institute for Performing Arts in April 2008.

2000s
Having achieved great popular success in musical theatre, Lloyd Webber was referred to by The New York Times in 2001 as "the most commercially successful composer in history". In 2002 he turned producer, bringing the musical Bombay Dreams to London. With music by Indian Music composer A.R. Rahman and lyrics by Don Black, it ran for two years at the Apollo Victoria Theatre. A revised Broadway production at the Broadway Theatre two years later ran for only 284 performances.

On 16 September 2004, his production of The Woman in White opened at the Palace Theatre in London. It ran for 19 months and 500 performances. A revised production opened on Broadway at the Marquis Theatre on 17 November 2005. Garnering mixed reviews from critics, due in part to the frequent absences of the show's star Maria Friedman due to breast cancer treatment, it closed only a brief three months later on 19 February 2006.

Lloyd Webber produced a staging of The Sound of Music, which débuted in November 2006. He made the controversial decision to choose an unknown to play leading lady Maria, who was found through the BBC's reality television show How Do You Solve a Problem like Maria?, in which he was a judge. The winner of the show was Connie Fisher.

A 2006 project, The Master and Margarita, was abandoned in 2007. In September 2006, Lloyd Webber was named a recipient of the Kennedy Center Honors with Zubin Mehta, Dolly Parton, Steven Spielberg, and Smokey Robinson. He was recognised for his outstanding contribution to American performing arts. He attended the ceremony on 3 December 2006; it aired on 26 December 2006. On 11 February 2007, Lloyd Webber was featured as a guest judge on the reality television show Grease: You're the One that I Want!. The contestants all sang "The Phantom of the Opera".

Between April and June 2007, he appeared in BBC One's Any Dream Will Do!, which followed the same format as How Do You Solve a Problem Like Maria?. Its aim was to find a new Joseph for his revival of Joseph and the Amazing Technicolor Dreamcoat. Lee Mead won the contest after quitting his part in the ensemble – and as understudy in The Phantom of the Opera – to compete for the role. Viewers' telephone voting during the series raised more than £500,000 for the BBC's annual Children in Need charity appeal, according to host Graham Norton on air during the final.

In 2007, Lloyd Webber's cat, Otto, leaped onto his Clavinova piano and "destroyed the entire score for the new 'Phantom' in one fell swoop". The Phantom in question was The Phantom of Manhattan, a planned sequel to The Phantom of the Opera.

On 1 July 2007, Lloyd Webber presented excerpts from his musicals as part of the Concert for Diana held at Wembley Stadium, London, an event organised to celebrate the life of Princess Diana almost 10 years after her death. BBC Radio 2 broadcast a concert of music from the Lloyd Webber musicals on 24 August 2007. Denise Van Outen introduced songs from Whistle Down the Wind, The Beautiful Game, Tell Me on a Sunday, The Woman in White, Evita  and Joseph and the Amazing Technicolor Dreamcoat – as well as Rodgers and Hammerstein's The Sound of Music, which Lloyd Webber revived in 2006 at the London Palladium, and the 2002 musical Bombay Dreams.

In April 2008, Lloyd Webber reprised his role as judge, this time in the BBC musical talent show I'd Do Anything. The show followed a similar format to its Maria and Joseph predecessors, this time involving a search for an actress to play the role of Nancy in a West End production of Lionel Bart's Oliver!, a musical based on the Charles Dickens' novel Oliver Twist. The show also featured a search for three young actors to play and share the title character's role, but the show's main focus was on the search for Nancy. The role was won by Jodie Prenger despite Lloyd Webber's stated preference for one of the other contestants; the winners of the Oliver role were Harry Stott, Gwion Wyn-Jones and Laurence Jeffcoate. Also in April 2008, Lloyd Webber was featured on the U.S. talent show American Idol, acting as a mentor when the 6 finalists had to select one of his songs to perform for the judges that week.

Lloyd Webber accepted the challenge of managing the UK's entry for the 2009 Eurovision Song Contest, to be held in Moscow. In early 2009 a series, called Eurovision: Your Country Needs You, was broadcast to find a performer for a song that he would compose for the competition. Jade Ewen won the right to represent Britain, winning with "It's My Time", by Lloyd Webber and Diane Warren. At the contest, Lloyd Webber accompanied her on the piano during the performance. The United Kingdom finished fifth in the contest.

On 8 October 2009, Lloyd Webber launched the musical Love Never Dies at a press conference held at Her Majesty's Theatre, where the original Phantom has been running since 1986. Also present were Sierra Boggess, who had been cast as Christine Daaé, and Ramin Karimloo, who portrayed Phantom, a role he had recently played in the West End.

2010s
Following the opening of Love Never Dies, Lloyd Webber again began a search for a new musical theatre performer in the BBC One series Over the Rainbow. He cast the winner, Danielle Hope, in the role of Dorothy, and a dog to play Toto in his forthcoming stage production of The Wizard of Oz. He and lyricist and composer Tim Rice wrote a number of new songs for the production to supplement the songs from the film.

On 1 March 2011, The Wizard of Oz opened at The Palladium Theatre, starring Hope as Dorothy and Michael Crawford as the Wizard. In 2012, Lloyd Webber fronted a new ITV primetime show Superstar which gave the UK public the chance to decide who would play the starring role of Jesus in an arena tour of Jesus Christ Superstar. The arena tour started in September 2012 and also starred comedian Tim Minchin as Judas Iscariot, former Spice Girl Melanie C as Mary Magdalene and BBC Radio 1 DJ Chris Moyles as King Herod. Tickets for most venues went on sale on 18 May 2012.

In 2013, Lloyd Webber reunited with Christopher Hampton and Don Black on Stephen Ward the Musical. For his next project, a 2015 musical adaptation of the 2003 film School of Rock, auditions were held for children aged nine to fifteen in cooperation with the School of Rock music education program, which predated the film by several years.

In April 2016, the English National Opera staged a revival of Sunset Boulevard at the London Coliseum. The limited run, semi-staged production directed by Lonny Price brought Glenn Close to reprise her star turn as "Norma Desmond", which was her first time performing the role in London; she had originated the role in Los Angeles in December 1993 and then on Broadway in November 1994 (which won her the 1995 Tony Award for Best Actress in a Musical). The 2016 London revival was so well-received that the production transferred to the Palace Theatre on Broadway in February 2017, making Lloyd Webber the first musical-theatre composer since 1953 to have four musicals running simultaneously on Broadway – a feat that his heroes Rodgers and Hammerstein had previously achieved.

Lloyd Webber's memoir, Unmasked, was published in 2018. On 9 September 2018, Lloyd Webber, along with Tim Rice and John Legend each won an Emmy for Jesus Christ Superstar Live in Concert. With this win, Lloyd Webber, Rice and Legend joined the list of people who have won Academy, Emmy, Grammy, and Tony Awards. Lloyd Webber wrote the song "Beautiful Ghosts" with Taylor Swift for the film adaptation of Cats, produced by Greg Wells and released in December 2019. In an interview in August 2020, Lloyd Webber called the film "ridiculous" in the ways that it changed the musical: "The problem with the film was that Tom Hooper decided that he didn't want anybody involved in it who was involved in the original show." He said that seeing the film caused him to get a dog.

2020s

Lloyd Webber's new version of Cinderella opened at the Gillian Lynne Theatre in the West End in 2021. The opening, which was originally set to take place in August 2020, was delayed due to the COVID-19 pandemic. Based on a book by Emerald Fennell, Lloyd Webber wrote: "Emerald Fennell has written something truly exciting and original, and the moment I read her outline I knew I'd found my latest collaborator." He garnered press attention in July 2021 for saying that he was "prepared to be arrested" to open Cinderella to full houses in spite of rising Covid cases and in defiance of Government advice. A 2021 feature in Variety suggested: 

In 2023, he was announced as one of the composers who would each create a brand new piece for the Coronation of Charles III and Camilla.

Accusations of plagiarism
Among the accusations of plagiarism that Lloyd Webber has received, the Dutch composer Louis Andriessen stated that he: "has yet to think up a single note; in fact, the poor guy's never invented one note by himself. That's rather poor". Lloyd Webber's biographer, John Snelson, acknowledged a similarity between the andante movement of Mendelssohn's Violin Concerto in E minor and the Jesus Christ Superstar song "I Don't Know How to Love Him", but wrote that Lloyd Webber:

An accusation of plagiarism regarded the 1971 Pink Floyd album Meddle. The sixth track of the album, "Echoes", has a riff on which Lloyd Webber allegedly based the opening organ riff in "The Phantom of the Opera". The two riffs share very similar notes and the order of the notes played. Lloyd Webber's pipe organ riff from "Phantom of the Opera" plays D, C, C, B, A, then ascending A, B, C, C, D. Pink Floyd's "Echoes" plays C, C, B, A, A, then ascending A, A, B, C, C. Pink Floyd bassist and co-lead vocalist Roger Waters pointed this out and said it was "probably actionable", but stated he did not care to take it to court.

Noting similarities between Lloyd Webber's "The Music of the Night" and a recurring melody in Giacomo Puccini's 1910 opera, La fanciulla del West (The Girl of the Golden West), in 1987 the Puccini estate filed a lawsuit against Lloyd Webber, accusing him of plagiarism. The case was settled out of court, but details were not released to the public. The songwriter Ray Repp claimed in a court case that Lloyd Webber had stolen a melody from his own song "Till You", but the court ruled in Lloyd Webber's favour.

Personal life
Lloyd Webber has been married three times. He married first Sarah Hugill on 24 July 1971 and they divorced on 14 November 1983. Together they had two children, a daughter and a son:
Imogen Lloyd Webber (born 31 March 1977)
Nicholas Lloyd Webber (born 2 July 1979)

He then married English soprano Sarah Brightman on 22 March 1984 in Hampshire. He cast Brightman in the lead role in his musical The Phantom of the Opera, among other notable roles. They divorced on 3 January 1990, but have remained close friends and have also continued to work together.

Thirdly, he married Madeleine Gurdon in Westminster on 9 February 1991. They have three children, two sons and one daughter, all of whom were born in the same city:
Alastair Adam Lloyd Webber (born 3 May 1992)
William Richard Lloyd Webber (born 24 August 1993)
Isabella Aurora Lloyd Webber (born 30 April 1996).

Lloyd Webber and his third wife Madeleine founded the Watership Down Stud in 1992. In 1996, they expanded their equestrian holdings by purchasing Kiltinan Castle Stud near Fethard in County Tipperary, Ireland.

In a 1971 interview with The New York Times, Lloyd Webber said he is an agnostic. He also said he views Jesus as "one of the great figures of history".

He is a lifelong supporter of London-based football club Leyton Orient F.C., just like his younger brother Julian.

In late 2009, Lloyd Webber had surgery for early-stage prostate cancer, but had to be readmitted to hospital with post-operative infection in November. In January 2010, he declared he was cancer-free. He had his prostate completely removed as a preventive measure.

Wealth
The Sunday Times Rich List 2006 ranked him the 87th-richest person in Britain with an estimated fortune of £700 million. His wealth increased to £750 million in 2007, but the publication ranked him 101st in 2008. The Sunday Times Rich List of 2019 saw him ranked the richest musician in the UK (overtaking Paul McCartney) with a fortune of £820 million. He lives at Sydmonton Court, Hampshire, and owns much of nearby Watership Down.

Lloyd Webber is an art collector, with a passion for Victorian painting. An exhibition of works from his collection was presented at the Royal Academy in 2003 under the title Pre-Raphaelite and Other Masters – The Andrew Lloyd Webber Collection. In 2006, Lloyd Webber planned to sell Portrait of Angel Fernández de Soto by Pablo Picasso to benefit the Andrew Lloyd Webber Foundation. In November 2006, he withdrew the painting from auction after a claim that the previous owner had been forced to sell it under duress in Nazi Germany. An out-of-court settlement was reached, where the foundation retained ownership rights. On 23 June 2010, the painting was sold at auction for £34.7 million to an anonymous telephone bidder.

Politics
Lloyd Webber was made a Conservative life peer in 1997; however by the end of 2015, he had voted only 33 times. Politically, Lloyd Webber has supported the UK's Conservative Party, allowing his song "Take That Look Off Your Face" to be used on a party promotional film seen by an estimated 1 million people before the 2005 general election. In August 2014, Lloyd Webber was one of 200 public figures who were signatories to a letter to The Guardian opposing Scottish independence in the run-up to September's referendum on that issue.

In October 2015, Lloyd Webber was involved in a contentious House of Lords vote over proposed cuts to tax credits, voting with the Government in favour of the plan. Lloyd Webber was denounced by his critics because he flew in from abroad on his personal plane to vote, when his voting record was scant. In October 2017, Lloyd Webber retired from the House of Lords, stating that his busy schedule was incompatible with the demands of Parliament considering the upcoming crucial Brexit legislation.

In July 2021, he told Good Morning Britain that he would never vote for the Conservatives again, due to their handling of the COVID-19 pandemic and poor treatment of the arts sector during that time.

Awards and honours

Lloyd Webber was appointed Knight Bachelor in the 1992 Birthday Honours for services to the arts. In the 1997 New Year Honours he was created a life peer as Baron Lloyd-Webber, of Sydmonton in the County of Hampshire. He is properly styled as The Lord Lloyd-Webber; the title is hyphenated, although his surname is not. He sat as a Conservative member of the House of Lords until his retirement from the House on 17 October 2017.

Theatre credits
Note: Music composed by Andrew Lloyd Webber unless otherwise noted.

 The Likes of Us (1965)
 Lyrics by Tim Rice
 Book by Leslie Thomas
 Not produced until 2005
 Joseph and the Amazing Technicolor Dreamcoat (1968)
 Lyrics by Tim Rice
 Jesus Christ Superstar (1970)
 Lyrics by Tim Rice
 Jeeves (1975)
 Book and lyrics by Alan Ayckbourn
 Revised in 1996 as By Jeeves
 Evita (1976)
 Lyrics by Tim Rice
 Tell Me on a Sunday (1979)
 Lyrics by Don Black
 Cats (1981)
 Lyrics based on Old Possum's Book of Practical Cats by T. S. Eliot 
 Additional lyrics after Eliot by Richard Stilgoe and Trevor Nunn
 Song and Dance (1982)
 Lyrics by Don Black (revised by Richard Maltby Jr. for Broadway)
 Combination of Variations (1978) and Tell Me on a Sunday (1979)
 Starlight Express (1984)
Lyrics by Richard Stilgoe
Later revisions by Don Black and David Yazbek
Inspired by The Railway Series books by The Rev. W. Awdry.
Cricket (1986)
Lyrics by Tim Rice
 First performed for Queen Elizabeth II's 60th birthday
 The Phantom of the Opera (1986)
 Lyrics by Charles Hart
 Additional Lyrics by Richard Stilgoe
 Book by Richard Stilgoe and Andrew Lloyd Webber
 Based on the novel by Gaston Leroux
 Aspects of Love (1989)
 Lyrics by Don Black and Charles Hart
 Book by Andrew Lloyd Webber
 Based on the David Garnett novel
 Sunset Boulevard (1993)
 Book and lyrics by Christopher Hampton and Don Black
 Based on the Billy Wilder film (1950)
 Whistle Down the Wind (1996)
 Lyrics by Jim Steinman
 Book by Patricia Knop, Andrew Lloyd Webber and Gale Edwards
 The Beautiful Game (2000)
 Book and lyrics by Ben Elton
 Updated as The Boys in the Photograph (2009)
 The Woman in White (2004)
 Lyrics by David Zippel
 Book by Charlotte Jones
 Based on the Wilkie Collins novel
 Based on elements of the short story The Signal-Man by Charles Dickens
 Love Never Dies (2010)
 Book & Lyrics by Glenn Slater
 Book by Ben Elton & Frederick Forsyth
 Additional lyrics by Charles Hart
 The Wizard of Oz (2011)
 Book by Andrew Lloyd Webber & Jeremy Sams
 Music by Harold Arlen
 Lyrics by E.Y. Harburg
 Additional music by Andrew Lloyd Webber
 Additional lyrics by Tim Rice
 Based on the 1939 motion picture The Wizard of Oz
 Based on the 1900 novel The Wonderful Wizard of Oz by L. Frank Baum
 Stephen Ward (2013)
 Book and lyrics by Christopher Hampton and Don Black
 School of Rock (2015)
 Lyrics by Glenn Slater
 Book by Julian Fellowes
 Based on the 2003 film
 Bad Cinderella (2021)
 Lyrics by David Zippel
 Book by Emerald Fennell
 Based on the classic story

Film adaptations
There have been a number of film adaptations of Lloyd Webber's musicals: Jesus Christ Superstar (1973), directed by Norman Jewison; Evita (1996), directed by Alan Parker; The Phantom of the Opera (2004), directed by Joel Schumacher and co-produced by Lloyd Webber; and Cats (2019), directed by Tom Hooper and executive produced by Lloyd Webber. Cats (1998), Joseph and the Amazing Technicolor Dreamcoat (1999), Jesus Christ Superstar (2000) and By Jeeves (2001) have been adapted into made-for-television films that have been released on DVD and VHS and often air on BBC.

A special performance of The Phantom of the Opera at the Royal Albert Hall for the 25th anniversary was broadcast live to cinemas in early October 2011 and later released on DVD and Blu-ray in February 2012. The same was also done with a reworked version of Love Never Dies. Filmed in Melbourne, Australia, it received a limited cinema release in the US and Canada in 2012, to see if it would be viable to bring the show to Broadway.

Other works
The Odessa File (1974) – Film score.
Variations (1978) – A set of musical variations on Niccolò Paganini's Caprice in A minor that Lloyd Webber composed for his brother, cellist Julian. This album featured fifteen rock musicians including guitarist Gary Moore and pianist Rod Argent and reached number 2 in the UK album chart upon its release. It was later combined with Tell Me on a Sunday to form one show, Song and Dance. Lloyd Webber also used variation five as the basis for Unexpected Song in Song and Dance. The main theme is used as the theme music to The South Bank Show.
Requiem (1985) – A classical choral work composed in honour of his father, William.
Watership Down (1999) – Lloyd Webber and Mike Batt, main soundtrack composer of the animated series adaptation of Richard Adams' novel of the same name, composed the song "Fields of Sun". The actual song was never used on the show, nor was it available on the CD soundtrack that was released at the time. He was however still credited for the unused song in the show's opening titles.

Discography
Musicals and show recordings

 The Likes of Us (1965)
 Joseph and the Amazing Technicolor Dreamcoat (1968)
 Jesus Christ Superstar (1970)
 Jeeves (1975)
 Evita (1976)
 Tell Me on a Sunday (1979)
 Cats (1981)
 Song and Dance (1982)
 Starlight Express (1984)
 The Phantom of the Opera (1986)
 Aspects of Love (1989)
 Sunset Boulevard (1993)
 Whistle Down the Wind (1998)
 The Beautiful Game (2000)
 The Woman in White (2004)
 Love Never Dies (2010)
 The Wizard of Oz (2011)
 Stephen Ward (2013)
 School of Rock (2015)
 Cinderella (2021)
 Bad Cinderella (2023)

Other albums
 Variations (1978)
 Variations with London Philharmonic Orchestra (1986)
 Symphonic Suites (2021)

See also 
 View of Geelong, 1856 painting once owned by Lloyd Webber

References

Further reading
 Pre-Raphaelite and Other Masters: The Andrew Lloyd Webber Collection – Royal Academy of Arts, London 2003 
 Cats on a Chandelier – Coveney, M (1999), Hutchinson, London
 Oh What a Circus – Rice, Tim (1999), Hodder & Stoughton, London
 Andrew Lloyd Webber – Snelson, John (2004), Yale University Press, New Haven CT. 
 Andrew Lloyd Webber: His Life and Works – Walsh, Michael (1989, revised and expanded, 1997), Abrams: New York

External links

 
 Biography at the Really Useful Group
 
 
Interview with Andrew Lloyd Webber in International Songwriters Association's "Songwriter Magazine"

 

 
1948 births
Living people
20th-century English composers
21st-century English composers
Alumni of Magdalen College, Oxford
Alumni of the Royal College of Music
Best Original Song Academy Award-winning songwriters
Brit Award winners
British ballet composers
British male songwriters
Broadway composers and lyricists
Broadway theatre producers
Composers awarded knighthoods
Conservative Party (UK) life peers
Conservative Party (UK) people
Drama Desk Award winners
English agnostics
English art collectors
English billionaires
English film score composers
English male composers
English male film score composers
English memoirists
English musical theatre composers
English opera composers
English philanthropists
English racehorse owners and breeders
English record producers
English songwriters
English television personalities
English theatre directors
English theatre managers and producers
Golden Globe Award-winning musicians
Grammy Award winners
Grammy Legend Award winners
Ivor Novello Award winners
Kennedy Center honorees
Knights Bachelor
Laurence Olivier Award winners
Lloyd Webber family
Male musical theatre composers
Male opera composers
Musicians awarded knighthoods
Musicians from London
Musicians who were peers
Oratorio composers
People educated at Westminster School, London
People from Kensington
People involved in plagiarism controversies
Primetime Emmy Award winners
Recipients of the Praemium Imperiale
Sony Classical Records artists
Special Tony Award recipients
Television personalities from London
Tony Award winners
Life peers created by Elizabeth II